Charles Livingstone Allen (1913 – August 30, 2005) was an American ordained United Methodist minister most notable for his work as a Pastor.

Born in Newborn, Georgia, he ministered around the state, including 1948 to 1960 at Grace United Methodist in Atlanta. During his tenure at Grace, it became the largest congregation in Georgia.  In 1960, he moved to Houston, Texas where he served at First United Methodist until 1983.  While at First Methodist, it became the largest Methodist congregation in the world at 12,000 members.

Allen was also a columnist for the Atlanta Journal and Atlanta Constitution during the 1950s and after that for the Houston Chronicle. He also authored inspirational books, including God's Psychiatry and All Things Are Possible Through Prayer: The Faith-Filled Guidebook That Can Change Your Life. He pioneered American TV ministries with his WSB-Channel 2 Atlanta Sunday night services beginning in 1956.

The section of Parkway Drive (which connects Highland Ave to Piedmont Park) north of Ponce de Leon in Atlanta was renamed in his honor in the 1960s.

References
 New Georgia Encyclopedia Biography
 Houston Chronicle Obituary
 Allen, Charles and Louis Marchiafava. Allen Charles Oral History, Houston Oral History Project, August 27, 1975.
 God's Psychiatry by Charles L. Allen God's Psychiatry Audiobook Amazon.com

1913 births
2005 deaths
Clergy from Atlanta
Clergy from Houston
People from Newton County, Georgia
American columnists
20th-century Methodist ministers
Journalists from Houston
American United Methodist clergy
20th-century American clergy